Acanthosaura armata  is a species of  agamid lizard commonly known as the armored pricklenape or peninsular horned tree lizard. A. armata can be found in China (Hainan), Myanmar, Thailand, Peninsular Malaysia, Singapore, and Indonesia (Sumatra).

References

External links 

 Photo by Bernard DUPONT

Acanthosaura
Reptiles of Myanmar
Reptiles of China
Reptiles of Indonesia
Reptiles of the Malay Peninsula
Reptiles of Singapore
Reptiles of Thailand
Reptiles described in 1827
Taxa named by John Edward Gray